Spain was represented by vocal group Mocedades at the Eurovision Song Contest 1973, held in Luxembourg. Mocedades were selected internally by Radiotelevisión Española (RTVE), the Spanish broadcaster, to represent the country at the contest in Luxembourg with the song "Eres tú".

At Eurovision 
Mocedades performed 7th in the night of the contest, following Monaco and preceding Switzerland. At the close of voting Mocedades had received 125 points, placing 2nd in a field of 17.

Voting

Congratulations: 50 Years of the Eurovision Song Contest

In 2005, "Eres tú" was one of fourteen songs chosen by Eurovision fans and an EBU reference group to participate in the Congratulations anniversary competition. It was the only Spanish entry featured, as well as one of three entries featured that did not actually win the contest the year it competed (the others being Domenico Modugno's "Nel blu, dipinto di blu" and Cliff Richard's "Congratulations"). The special was broadcast live on Spanish broadcaster RTVE, with commentary by Beatriz Pécker and José María Íñigo.

"Eres tú" appeared fourth in the running order, following "Diva" by Dana International and preceding "Ein bißchen Frieden" by Nicole. Like the majority of entries that night, the performance was mostly by a group of dancers alongside footage of Mocedades' Eurovision performance, with the group themselves appearing toward the end of the performance (notably, appearing very moved at the warm reception they received from the audience in Copenhagen). At the end of the first round, "Eres tú" was not one of the five entries announced as proceeding to the second round. It was later revealed that the song finished eleventh with 90 points. In the second round, without their own entry to vote for, Spain's twelve points were awarded to ABBA's "Waterloo," which ultimately won.

Voting

References 

1973
Countries in the Eurovision Song Contest 1973
Eurovision